The Wanda Gág House is a historic house museum at 226 North Washington Street in New Ulm, Minnesota.  The museum commemorates the life and legacy of author and artist Wanda Gág (1893-1946), whose childhood home this was.  Built in 1898, it is a fine example of Queen Anne Victorian architecture, and was listed on the National Register of Historic Places in 1979.

Description
The Gág House stands in an residential area just southwest of downtown New Ulm, at the junction of North Washington Street and 3rd Street North.  It is a -story wood-frame building, with a complex roofline and exterior finished in a combination of wooden clapboards and shingles.  Its front facade has a projecting gable section on the right, with a broad polygonal bay one story in height topped by a single sash window.  The bay windows are interspersed with wooden panels, and a field of diamond-cut shingles is set below the upper window.  To the left of the projecting section is a porch elaborately decorated with turned posts and balusters, and a spindled valance overhead.

The house was built in 1894 by Anton Gag, and served from then until 1913 as the childhood home of Wanda Gág (who adopted the accented "a" as an adult).  Gág was a successful artist and illustrator, and is credited with producing one of the first picture books in 1926.  The house was acquired by a non-profit organization in 1988.  It was restored, and opened as a museum dedicated to Gág in 2008.

See also
National Register of Historic Places listings in Brown County, Minnesota

References

External links
Wanda Gag House web site

Biographical museums in Minnesota
Houses completed in 1894
Houses on the National Register of Historic Places in Minnesota
Literary museums in the United States
Museums in Brown County, Minnesota
National Register of Historic Places in Brown County, Minnesota
New Ulm, Minnesota
Queen Anne architecture in Minnesota
Women's museums in the United States
1894 establishments in Minnesota